Lionel Claude Briand, born in Paris, France, on November 21, 1965, is a software engineer, and professor at the University of Ottawa and University of Luxembourg. He is an IEEE Fellow, a Canada Research Chair in Intelligent Software Dependability and Compliance and a European Research Council Advanced grantee. His research foci are testing, verification, and validation of software systems; applying machine learning and evolutionary computation to software engineering; and software quality assurance, among others. He was vice-director of the University of Luxembourg's SnT - Interdisciplinary Centre for Security, Reliability and Trust from 2014 to 2019, and editor in chief of Empirical Software Engineering (Springer) from 2003 to 2016.
In 2012, he was a recipient of the Harlan D. Mills Award.

Selected research
Arcuri, Andrea, and Lionel Briand. "A practical guide for using statistical tests to assess randomized algorithms in software engineering." 2011 33rd International Conference on Software Engineering (ICSE). IEEE, 2011.
Andrews, James H., Lionel C. Briand, and Yvan Labiche. "Is mutation an appropriate tool for testing experiments?." Proceedings of the 27th international conference on Software engineering. ACM, 2005.
Briand, Lionel C., John W. Daly, and Jurgen K. Wust. "A unified framework for coupling measurement in object-oriented systems." IEEE Transactions on software Engineering 25.1 (1999): 91–121.
Basili, Victor R., Lionel C. Briand, and Walcélio L. Melo. "A validation of object-oriented design metrics as quality indicators." IEEE Transactions on software engineering 22.10 (1996): 751–761.

References

External links
 

Software engineers
Academic staff of the University of Ottawa
University of Luxembourg
Living people
1965 births
Software testing people